Clarence E. Dietz (April 17, 1919 – June 23, 1993) was a former Republican member of the Pennsylvania House of Representatives. He was born in 1919 to Clarence and Mary Elizabeth Dietz.

He died in 1993 at his Bedford County home after a short illness.

References

1919 births
1993 deaths
People from Turtle Creek, Pennsylvania
Republican Party members of the Pennsylvania House of Representatives
20th-century American politicians